26 Aquilae (abbreviated 26 Aql) is a binary star system in the equatorial constellation of Aquila. 26 Aquilae is its Flamsteed designation though it also bears the Bayer designation f Aquilae. It has an apparent visual magnitude of 5.00, which means it is faintly visible to the naked eye. As the Earth orbits the Sun, this star system undergoes a parallax shift of 21.15 mas.

This is a single-lined spectroscopic binary system, meaning that the presence of an orbiting companion is revealed through shifts in the spectrum of the primary star. The pair orbit each other with a period of 266.544 days at a high eccentricity of 0.833. Little is known about this companion, although its mass can be estimated as 140% of the Sun's.

The primary component has a stellar classification of G8 III-IV. The luminosity class of III-IV indicates the spectrum resembles that of a star part way between the subgiant and giant stages of its evolution. It has more than three times the mass of the Sun and six times the Sun's radius. At this heat, the star glows with the characteristic yellow hue of a G-type star.

References

External links
 Image 26 Aquilae
 CCDM J19205-0524
 HR 7333

Aquilae, f
Aquilae, 26
181391
Spectroscopic binaries
Aquila (constellation)
095066
7333
Durchmusterung objects
G-type stars